Horace Victor Pope (5 June 1887 – 19 June 1949) was an Australian rules footballer who played for . He captained the club in the second half of 1919.

Family
The son of Rev. Henry James Pope (1844-1919), and Grace Holman Pope (1857-1920), née Temby, Horace Victor Pope was born in North Adelaide, South Australia on 5 June 1887.

He married Eliza Hilda Williams (1880-1957) on 1 July 1912, They had three children: a stillborn daughter, and two sons, Kenneth Charles Pope (1917-1944), and Richard Horace Pope (1919-1942).

Football
From 1905 to 1919, Horrie Pope played 155 games for Port Adelaide; and he also played in one additional game in 1920. When Alex "Bandy" McFarlane resigned mid-way through the 1919 season, Pope was appointed captain of the team.

Death
Horrie Pope died at his home at Franklin (now known as Pennington, South Australia) on 19 June 1949, and was buried at the Cheltenham Cemetery on 21 June 1949.

References

References
 Horrie Pope, australianfootball.com.

1887 births
1949 deaths
Port Adelaide Football Club (SANFL) players
Port Adelaide Football Club players (all competitions)
Australian rules footballers from South Australia